All at Once is an American drama film, directed by and starring Jon Abrahams. The film, written by Michael Testone, also stars Annie Potts, Erika Christensen, Lydia Hearst, Summer Phoenix, Mickey Sumner, Martin Donovan, and Stephen Henderson.

The film had its world premiere at the Napa Valley Film Festival on November 9, 2016.

Premise 
A young artist in New York City accepts guardianship of his two best friends' young daughters after their parents perish in the September 11 attacks. Eleven years later, he moves back to his hometown of Buffalo, New York to raise the two girls after suffering from the financial strains of living in the City.

Cast
 Jon Abrahams as James Maxwell
 Annie Potts as Ginny Maxwell
 Erika Christensen as Tiffany Fontinella
 Scott Caan as Alexander Clarke
 Lydia Hearst as Amy
 Summer Phoenix as Samantha
 Mickey Sumner as Bridget
 Martin Donovan as Giovanni Sacco
 Stephen Henderson as Robert
 Liza Colón-Zayas as Linda Ramirez
 Mia Serafino as Beth Clarke
 Sasha Frolova as Alexis Clarke
 Nicole Elizabeth Berger as Grace Clarke
 Christian George as Lou Fontanelle
 Antoine Lanier as Norman
 Diane Gnagnarelli as Joanie

Production
Principal photography began on July 27, 2015, in Manhattan. Filming moved to Buffalo, New York on August 1, 2015. Production was announced at a press conference featuring an appearance from Buffalo's mayor, Byron Brown, alongside a representative of the Buffalo Niagara Film Office and members of the cast and crew (including Jon Abrahams, Erika Christensen, and the director of photography Matthew Quinn).

Release and reception
The film had its world premiere at the Napa Valley Film Festival on November 9, 2016.

References

External links
 
 

2016 films
American drama films
American independent films
Films set in New York (state)
2016 drama films
2016 independent films
2010s English-language films
Films shot in Buffalo, New York
2010s American films